Rebecca Ann "Becky" Bereswill (born October 2, 1990) is an American figure skater. She is the 2008 Junior Grand Prix Final champion.  In 2014, she was cast as Elsa in the Disney on Ice version of Frozen.

Personal life
Rebecca Ann Bereswill, nicknamed Becky, was born in 1990 in Houston, Texas. She is the elder of identical twins; her twin sister, Allison, is also a figure skater and track and field athlete.

Bereswill studied ballet with the Houston Ballet from age four to thirteen and appeared in a local production of The Nutcracker and Sleeping Beauty.

She attended pre-school through middle school at The Post Oak School in Bellaire, Texas, and then went next door to high school at the Episcopal High School in Bellaire, Texas. She graduated summa cum laude in 2009 and currently attends the University of Michigan in Ann Arbor, Michigan.

Figure skating career
Bereswill began skating at age seven with her sister. She competed on the regional and sectional level in the United States for many years. In the 2003–04 season, competing on the novice level, she won the silver medal at her regional championships to qualify for the sectional championships, where she placed 12th. The following season, she remained on the novice level and again won the silver medal at her regional championship to advance to sectionals, where she moved up from the previous year to place 7th. She moved up to the junior level in the 2005–06 season and qualified for sectionals, where she placed 5th and missed qualifying for the national championships by one placement. In the 2006–07 season, remaining on the junior level, she again qualified for her sectional championship, where she placed 8th on the junior level.

In the 2007–08 season, having moved up to the senior level, Bereswill won her regional championship and won the silver medal at her sectional championship to qualify for the United States Figure Skating Championships for the first time in her career. At the 2008 United States Figure Skating Championships, she placed 10th on the senior level. Following the national championships, she made her senior international debut at the AEGON Challenge Cup spring competition in The Hague, Netherlands and won the bronze medal.

In the 2008–09 season, she made her junior international debut. She won the silver medal at both her events on the 2008–09 ISU Junior Grand Prix circuit in Courcheval, France and Madrid, Spain. She qualified for the 2008–2009 ISU Junior Grand Prix Final in Seoul, Korea. At the Final, she won the gold medal overall by placing fourth in the short program and second in the free skate. She is the last American to win this title.  At the 2009 U.S. Championships, Bereswill placed 18th and was not placed on the U.S. team to the 2009 World Junior Championships. During the 2009-10 season, she competed at the 2010 Finlandia Trophy and NHK Grand Prix in Nagano, Japan.

In May 2010, Bereswill began training in pair skating, teaming up with Trevor Young. They finished 10th at the 2011 U.S. Championships and parted ways in March 2011.

During the 2012-13 season, Bereswill won the Eastern Great Lakes Championship and won silver at the 2013 Midwestern Championships to qualify for the 2013 U.S. Championships in Omaha, Nebraska. In 2014, she was cast as Elsa in the Disney On Ice version of Frozen.

Track and field career
Bereswill competed in track and field for her high school, Episcopal High School.

She medaled in cross country running in 2007 at the Southwest Preparatory Conference Championships. She competed in the 4x800-meter relay at the 2008 Texas Relays at the University of Texas and won the gold medal in the high school division and broke their high school record in the process.

Programs

Single skating

Competitive highlights

Single skating

Detailed results

 SP = Short program; FS = Free skating

 SP = Short program; FS = Free skating

 SP = Short program; FS = Free skating

 QR = Qualifying round; SP = Short program; FS = Free skating

 QR = Qualifying round; SP = Short program; FS = Free skating

 QR = Qualifying round; SP = Short program; FS = Free skating

 QR = Qualifying round; SP = Short program; FS = Free skating

References

Other sources
 
 
 
 
 
 
 
 
 AEGON Challenge Cup 2008
 2008–2009 ISU Grand Prix Final
 Track & Field Results Profile
 Cross Country Results Profile

External links

 
 
 
 Tracings.net profile

American female single skaters
1990 births
Living people
Sportspeople from Houston
Identical twins
American twins
Twin sportspeople
21st-century American women